Kliny is a rural locality (a settlement) in Bavlenskoye Rural Settlement, Kolchuginsky District, Vladimir Oblast, Russia. The population was 36 as of 2010.

Geography 
Kliny is located 23 km northeast of Kolchugino (the district's administrative centre) by road. Kliny (selo) is the nearest rural locality.

References 

Rural localities in Kolchuginsky District